Bezirganlar is a village in the Biga District of Çanakkale Province in Turkey. Its population is 116 (2021).

References

Villages in Biga District